Phillip Hamman was an American soldier in the Revolutionary War of 1775–1783. In 1823 he was ordained preacher of the Friendship Baptist Church of Fackler, Alabama. In 1970 the Tidence Lane chapter of the Daughters of the American Revolution placed a marker on his grave.

References

Further reading

Ralph Hammond. Phillip Hamman, man of valor. Huntsville, Alabama: Strode Publishers, 1976.

1753 births
1832 deaths
Kentucky pioneers
Virginia colonial people
German emigrants to the Thirteen Colonies
Virginia militiamen in the American Revolution
People from Jackson County, Alabama